The Brazilian Volleyball Super League is the top level Brazilian professional volleyball competition. It is organized by the Brazilian Volleyball Confederation. It shares the same name with the women's tournament, and are disputed simultaneously. The number of participating clubs varies every year. The champion team qualifies for the South American Championship. Vôlei Natal, who play at the 10,000-capacity Ginásio Nélio Dias, are the current champions.

History

First competitions 

Until the early 1960s, there were only state volleyball competitions in Brazil. A national level competition was inconceivable because of the geographical distances and lack of transportation infrastructure. Only in 1962 the first national volleyball competition was disputed, the Guarani Trophy of Champion clubs. The competition was disputed two more times, being renamed in 1964 to Brazilian Championship of Champion Clubs. Between 1965 and 1967 there was a hiatus without a national level competition, until the Brazilian Trophy was organized in 1968 with teams from Rio de Janeiro, São Paulo and Minas Gerais. The competition was organized in such format until 1975.

Fully national competition and professionalism 

Only in 1976, the competition was opened to amateur clubs from all Brazilian states, and became truly national. It was renamed to Brazilian Championship and was held every second year. In 1980 the Brazilian Championship had a major reorganization, becoming an annual competition and allowing professional teams for the first time. The competition's format changed in 1988, and started to follow the northern hemisphere calendar. Also, it was renamed to Brazilian National League. The competition was disputed under this format between the seasons 1988-89 and 1993–94.

The foundation of Super League 

There was a last major change in the organization of the competition in the 1994–95 season. Again, it was renamed to Brazilian National Super League. The first champion of the tournament, with the present format, was Frangosul/Ginástica.

List of champions

Campeonato Brasileiro

Liga Nacional

Superliga

Titles by team

Women's league

The Women's Superliga most successful team have been Rio de Janeiro Vôlei Clube with eleven titles, since the creation of the Superliga, when Leites Nestlé won three consecutives titles from 1994–95 to 1996–97.

Sponsor
 Banco do Brasil
 Mikasa Sports
 ASICS
 Delta Air Lines
 Gatorade
 SporTV
 RedeTV!
 VoeGOL
 Grupo Cimed
 Globo
 Sky

References

External links
 Superliga official website
 Confederação Brasileira de Voleibol (CBV) official website

Volleyball competitions in Brazil
Brazil
Sports leagues in Brazil
Sports leagues established in 1976
Professional sports leagues in Brazil